THY LAB is an independent art space in Hong Kong with a focus on visual research, film, performance art, and educational programs. It is home to a collection of Hong Kong home-made movies and family photographs, which constitutes the largest collection of found footage in Hong Kong, comprising 9,000 items donated by local residents.

Located in Sham Shui Po, the space is also used as an artist-run squat as it occupies a re-purposed Hong Kong rooftop slum that is turned into a theater with free admission policy. Since 2013, the back alley space has been occupied, reclaimed as a 24-hour open-air public art museum, and renamed as Thy Lane Museum.

Hosting screenings, performances, and workshops, THY LAB has produced collectively-authored films and performances, and has trained more than 500 filmmakers and performers. Since 2013, the space hosted international filmmakers, performers, and scholars, notably South Korean filmmaker Kim Ki Duk and Hong Kong actress Maggie Cheung.

References 

Hong Kong art